A me piace così is the first solo studio album from Emma Marrone published on October 19, 2010 from label Universal Music. The record, preceded by the single "Con le nuvole", consists of twelve tracks, including a cover the song "La lontananza" by Domenico Modugno. In November  is published "Special Edition" of the disc, which contains both the traces of A me piace cosi so that the traces of her debut EP Oltre, with the addition of two previously unreleased tracks: "L'amore che ho", scritta da Neffa and the cover of "(Sittin' On) The Dock of the Bay", sung with Craig David and also included in the digital version of David's album Signed Sealed Delivered (2010).

The February 16, 2011, in conjunction with the participation of the singer in the Sanremo Music Festival 2011, a duet with Modà, was published Sanremo Edition album with a new cover, the song of Sanremo "Arriverà", plus two new songs "Io son per te l'amore" and "Per sempre". In May "Arriverà" is certified multiplatinum digital.

The album was certified Double platinum by the Federation of the Italian Music Industry. In Switzerland has reached its maximum with the 50th position of the Swiss Music Charts, remaining in the charts for the next three weeks.

Track listing

Charts

A me piace cosi Tour 

On March 15, 2011, Emma has opened the only Italian date of the tour of Taylor Swift, while the previous month at the beginning of the A me piace cosi tour, she opened for three dates of the tour of Gianna Nannini. To coincide with the tour, she opened two dates for Vasco Rossi during Vasco Live Kom '011. The tour began with the zero date 8 June 2011 and June 10, 2011 made a stop in Slovenia. She continued the tour in Italy from June 15, 2011 until July 16, 2011, stopping in the following cities:

Date 
 8 June Porto San Giorgio (FM) - Palasavelli
 10 June Nova Gorica (GO) - Park Casinò
 15 June Balvano (PZ) - Area mercato di Balvano
 16 June Napoli (NA) - Mostra d'Oltremare
 18 June Pontedera (PI) - Piazza notte bianca
 25 June Piazzola sul Brenta (PD) - Anfiteatro Camerini - Live Festival
 26 June Monza (MB) - Cortile della villa reale - Monzaestate 2011
 30 June Parma (PR) - Eurotorri
 3 July Caltanissetta (CL) - Campo sportivo di Caltanissetta
 5 July Lamezia Terme (CZ) - Campo sportivo Guido D'Ippolito
 6 July Noci (BA) - Foro Boario di Noci
 8 July Scorrano (LE) - Campo sportivo
 9 July Castrovillari (CS) - Piazza
 10 July San Vito dei Normanni (BR) - Piazza
 12 July Grugliasco (TO) - Le gru
 13 July Varallo (VC) - Piazza
 15 July Savona (SV) - Stadio Bacigalupo
 16 July Ventimiglia (IM) - Piazza

support
 15 March Milan (MI) - Mediolanum Forum - Support Taylor Swift
 4 May Rome   (RO) - PalaLottomatica - Support Gianna Nannini
 5 May Rome   (RO) - PalaLottomatica - Support Gianna Nannini
 14 May Caserta (CA) - PalaMaggiò - Support Gianna Nannini
 21 June Milan (MI) - Stadio Giuseppe Meazza - Support Vasco Rossi
 22 June Milan (MI) - Stadio Giuseppe Meazza - Support Vasco Rossi

Setlist 
Ho toccato il cielo 
Emozioniamoci ora
Cullami
Sembra strano
On line
Folle Paradiso 
Dimmi che senso ha 
La lontananza
L'esigenza di te 
Valerie
L'amore che ho
Per sempre
Petali
Dalle vene
Meravigliosa   
Purché tua
Arida 
Davvero
Con le nuvole
Oro nero
Colori
Io son per te l'amore
America
Calore
Arriverà

Band 
 Flavio Pasquetto: Electric guitars and acoustic guitars
 Simone De Filippis: Electric guitars and acoustic guitars
 Luca Cirillo: Keyboard
 Daniele Formica: Drums
 Pietro Casadei: Electric bass

References

2010 debut albums
Emma Marrone albums